Parilexia is a genus of geometrid moths in the family Geometridae. There are at least three described species in Parilexia.

Species
These three species belong to the genus Parilexia:
 Parilexia antilleata Ferguson, 2009
 Parilexia nicetaria (Guenée in Boisduval & Guenée, 1858)
 Parilexia proditata (Walker, 1861)

References

Further reading

 
 
 

Caberini
Articles created by Qbugbot